Bojana Božanić is a Serbian politician and administrator. She served in the National Assembly of Serbia from 2012 to 2014 as a member of the Democratic Party of Serbia (Demokratska stranka Srbije, DSS) and has been active in the municipal politics of Čajetina. Božanić is now a member of Healthy Serbia (Zdrava Srbija, ZS). Since 2016, she has been the director of the public company Gold Gondola Zlatibor.

Private career
Božanić is a graduate of the University of Belgrade Faculty of Philology in 2006, with a degree in English.

Politician

Democratic Party of Serbia
Božanić appeared in the seventh position on the DSS's electoral list for Čajetina in the 2008 Serbian local elections. Under the leadership of incumbent mayor Milan Stamatović, the party won a majority victory with eighteen out of thirty-one seats. For this electoral cycle, all assembly mandates were awarded to candidates on successful lists at the discretion of the sponsoring parties or coalitions, irrespective of numerical order; Božanić was not given a mandate and was instead appointed as an assistant to Stamatović.

Parliamentarian (2012–2014)
Serbia's electoral laws were reformed in 2011, such that all mandates were awarded to candidates on successful lists in numerical order. Božanić received the twenty-first position on the DSS's electoral list in the 2012 Serbian parliamentary election and was elected when the list won exactly twenty-one mandates. The Serbian Progressive Party (Srpska napredna stranka, SNS) and the Socialist Party of Serbia (Socijalistička partija Srbije, SPS) formed a coalition government after the election, and the DSS served in opposition. One of the youngest members in the assembly, Božanić was a member of the committee on human and minority rights and gender equality; a deputy member of the committee on the economy, regional development, trade, tourism, and energy; a deputy member of the committee for spatial planning, transport, infrastructure, and telecommunications; a deputy member of the committee for environmental protection; and a member of the parliamentary friendship groups with France, Norway, and the United Kingdom. She was also a member of the informal green parliamentary group.

Božanić was also given the third position on the DSS's list for Čajetina in the 2012 local elections, which took place concurrently with the parliamentary vote, and was elected when the list won a majority victory with sixteen mandates. She appears to have resigned her seat shortly after the election to serve another term as an assistant to Mayor Stamatović. 

She was promoted to the twelfth position on the DSS list in the 2014 parliamentary election. The list did not cross the electoral threshold for assembly representation.

Serbian People's Party
The DSS experienced a split in 2014, and both Stamanović and Božanić became founding members of a breakaway group called the Serbian People's Party (Srpska narodna partija, SNP). In early 2016, Božanić resigned as assistant to the mayor and was appointed as director of a new public company called Gold Gondola Zlatibor.

The SNP, DSS, and Party of United Pensioners of Serbia (Partija ujedinjenih penzionera Srbije, PUPS) ran a combined electoral list in Čajetina in the 2016 local elections. Božanić received the third position on their list and was again elected when the alliance won twenty-one mandates. She resigned her seat on 9 May 2016.

Healthy Serbia
In 2017, Milan Stamanović left the SNP to form a new political party called Healthy Serbia (ZS). Božanić joined the new party and was chosen as one of its inaugural vice-presidents. The ZS and DSS ran a combined list in Čajetina for the 2020 local elections; Božanić appeared in the fourth position and was elected for a third term when the list won twenty seats. She again appears to have resigned shortly after the election, and on 1 October 2020 she was appointed to a new four-year team as director of Gold Gondola Zlatibor.

Healthy Serbia contested the 2020 parliamentary election in an alliance with Better Serbia (Bolja Srbija, BS), and Božanić received the fourth position on their combined list. The party later contested the 2022 parliamentary election as part of the Sovereignists coalition, and Božanić appeared in the eleventh position. In both cases, the list failed to cross the electoral threshold.

References

1981 births
Living people
People from Čajetina
21st-century Serbian women politicians
21st-century Serbian politicians
Members of the National Assembly (Serbia)
Democratic Party of Serbia politicians
Serbian People's Party (2014) politicians
Healthy Serbia politicians
Women members of the National Assembly (Serbia)